Richard Todd Bidner (born July 5, 1961) is a Canadian retired ice hockey centre.

Bidner was born in Petrolia, Ontario. Drafted in 1980 by the Washington Capitals, Bidner played a dozen games with the Capitals. He spent most of his playing career playing in Great Britain and played for their national team at the 1994 World Championship, Pool A.

In August 2006 it was announced that Bidner will become the new assistant coach of the London Knights of the Ontario Hockey League.

On February 17, 2012, Bidner was hired to replace Sean Gillam as head coach of the SPHL's Fayetteville FireAntz.

References

External links

Profile at hockeydraftcentral.com

1961 births
Living people
Amarillo Rattlers players
Bracknell Bees players
British ice hockey centres
Canadian ice hockey centres
Fife Flyers players
Hershey Bears players
Humberside Seahawks players
London Knights coaches
Moncton Alpines (AHL) players
Nottingham Panthers players
Nova Scotia Oilers players
People from Lambton County
Peterborough Pirates players
Teesside Bombers players
Telford Tigers players
Toronto Marlboros players
Washington Capitals draft picks
Washington Capitals players
Canadian expatriate ice hockey players in England
Canadian expatriate ice hockey players in Scotland
Canadian ice hockey coaches
Canadian expatriate ice hockey players in the United States
Naturalised citizens of the United Kingdom
Naturalised sports competitors